Sorrento is a town overlooking the Bay of Naples in Southern Italy. A popular tourist destination, Sorrento is located on the Sorrentine Peninsula at the south-eastern terminus of the Circumvesuviana rail line, within easy access from Naples and Pompei. The town is widely known for its small ceramics, lacework and marquetry (woodwork) shops.

The Sorrentine Peninsula has views of Naples, Vesuvius and the Isle of Capri. The Amalfi Drive, connecting Sorrento and Amalfi, is a narrow road along the high cliffs above the Tyrrhenian Sea.

Ferries and hydrofoils connect the town to Naples, Amalfi, Positano, Capri and Ischia.

Limoncello, a digestif made from lemon rinds, alcohol, water and sugar, is produced in Sorrento along with citrus fruit, wine, nuts and olives.

History

Origins
From the 8th century BC the area had the presence of a community of indigenous villages, which was a crossing point for Etruscan traffic. Subsequently, the area fell into the hands of the Osci, who exercised an important influence there, in fact the oldest ruins of Surrentum are Oscan, dating from about 600 BC.

Before its control by the Roman Republic, Surrentum was one of the towns subject to Nuceria, and shared its fortunes up to the Social War; it seems to have joined in the revolt of 90 BC like Stabiae; and was reduced to obedience in the following year, when it seems to have received a colony.

Numerous sepulchral inscriptions of Imperial slaves and freedmen have been found at Surrentum. An inscription shows that Titus in the year after the earthquake of 79 AD restored the horologium (clock) of the town and its architectural decoration. A similar restoration of an unknown building in Naples in the same year is recorded in an inscription from the last-named town.

The most important temples of Surrentum were those of Athena and of the Sirens (the latter the only one in the Greek world in historic times); the former gave its name to the promontory. In antiquity, Surrentum was famous for its wine (oranges and lemons which are now widely cultivated there were not yet introduced in Italy in antiquity), its fish, and its red Campanian vases; the discovery of coins of Massilia, Gaul, and the Balearic Islands here indicates the extensive trade which it carried on.

The position of Surrentum was very secure, protected by deep gorges. The arrangement of the modern streets preserves that of the ancient town, and the disposition of the walled paths which divide the plain to the east seems to date in like manner from Roman times. No ruins are now preserved in the town itself, but there are many remains in the villa quarter to the east of the town on the road to Stabiae, of which traces still exist, running much higher than the modern road, across the mountain.

The site of one of the largest (possibly belonging to the Imperial house) is now occupied by the Hotel Vittoria, under the terrace of which a small theatre was found in 1855; an ancient rock-cut tunnel descends hence to the shore. Greek and Oscan tombs have also been found.

Another suburb lay below the town and on the promontory on the west of it; under the Hotel Sirena are substructions and a rock-hewn tunnel. To the north-west on the Capo di Sorrento is another villa, the so-called Bagni della Regina Giovanna, with baths, and in the bay to the south-west was the villa of Pollius Felix, the friend of Statius, which he describes in Silvae ii. 2, of which remains still exist. Farther west again are villas, as far as the temple of Athena on the promontory named after her at the extremity of the peninsula (now Punta Campanella). Neither of this nor of the famous temple of the Sirens are any traces existing.

In the mythology, according to the Greek historian Diodorus Siculus, Sorrento was founded by Liparus, son of Ausonus, who was king of the Ausoni and the son of Ulysses and Circe. The ancient city was probably connected to the Ausoni tribe, one of the most ancient ethnic groups in the area. In the pre-Roman age, Sorrento was influenced by the Greek civilization: this can be seen in its plant and in the presence of the Athenaion, a great sanctuary, also, according to the legend, founded by Ulysses and originally devoted to the cult of the Sirens, hence Sorrento's name.

Middle Ages and modern era

Sorrento became an archbishopric around 420 AD. After the fall of the Western Roman Empire, it was ruled by the Ostrogoths and then returned to the Eastern Empire. The Lombards, who conquered much of southern Italy in the second half of the 6th century, besieged it in vain.

In the following centuries the authority of the distant Empire of Byzantium faded; initially part of the substantially independent Duchy of Naples, later Sorrento became in turn an autonomous duchy in the 9th century. It fought against neighbouring/rival Amalfi, the Saracens and the nearby Lombardic duchies, such as that of Duchy of Benevento, whose forces besieged it in 839, although Sorrento was able to resist with Neapolitan help. Sorrentine forces took part in the anti-Saracen leagues at the battles of Licosa (846) and Ostia (849). The duchy was ruled by figures elected by the people, which received honorary titles from the Byzantine Emperor.

In 1035 the city was acquired by Guaimar IV of Salerno, who gave it to his brother Guy. After a brief return under the Duchy of Naples, it returned in Lombard hands with Gisulf II of Salerno; when the latter was defeated by Robert Guiscard, Sorrento entered the Norman sphere of influence: any residual independence was ended in 1137 when it was conquered by Roger II of Sicily, and annexed to the Kingdom of Sicily.

On 13 June 1558 it was sacked by elements of the Ottoman navy under the command of Dragut and his lieutenant Piali, as part of the struggle between the Turks and Spain, which controlled the southern half of Italy at that time. 2,000 captives were reportedly taken away. This struggle was waged throughout the Mediterranean and lasted many decades. The attackers were not "pirates" as often characterised, though some may have been mercenaries from North Africa. The campaigns were conducted on the direct orders of Sultan Suleiman. The attack led to the construction of a new line of walls. The most striking event of the following century was the revolt against Spanish domination of 1648, led by Giovanni Grillo. In 1656 a plague struck the city. However, Sorrento remained one of the most important centres of southern Campania.

Sorrento entered into the Neapolitan Republic of 1799, but in vain. 

In the 19th century the economy of the city improved markedly, favoured by the development of agriculture, tourism and trade. A route connecting Sorrento to Castellammare di Stabia was opened under the reign of Ferdinand II (1830–1859). In 1861 Sorrento was officially annexed to the new Kingdom of Italy. In the following years it confirmed and increased its status of one of the most renowned tourist destinations of Italy, a trend which continued into the 20th century. Famous people who visited it include Lord Byron, Keats, Goethe, Friedrich Nietzsche, Henrik Ibsen and Walter Scott.

Fortifications and castles
Having been a city victim of numerous attacks by pirates for its riches, Sorrento boasted in the past numerous castles and fortifications, especially on the strip of land that runs along the sea.

Sorrento, legends and myths
The myth of the Sirens has hovered over Sorrento since the beginning of time. Three mermaids settled near Punta Campanella enchanting the seafarers in transit through those waters. Even the great Ulysses had to use stratagems to resist the deadly song of the Sirens.

The beach of Queen Giovanna 
Among the most evocative beaches of Sorrento we can certainly count "Queen Giovanna" a natural swimming pool near the summer residence of the homonymous ruler. It is said that Queen Giovanna d'Angiò spent her summer holidays pleasantly in Sorrento.
Having many lovers she indulged them right on this beach. After taking advantage of them she had them drowned by her soldiers.

Rites of Holy week
The two main processions that take place in Sorrento on Good Friday are the Procession of Our Lady of Sorrows (or the "Visit in the Sepulchres"), organised by the Venerable Arciconfraternita of Saint Monica and the Procession of the Crucified Christ, organised by the Venerable Arciconfraternita of the Death.

The first procession takes place at 3:30 a.m. on Holy (Maundy) Thursday and involves hundreds of participants dressed in hooded white gowns. The Madonna is carried aloft in the procession and is accompanied by several religious articles as she searches the town looking for her son. The procession starts in Corso Italia, turns through Piazza Tasso, and then visits each of the town's churches—stopping in each one for a short ceremony. The Madonna is accompanied by aides carrying incense, and a large male choir and band. The procession concludes at 5:30 a.m.

The second procession occurs at 8 p.m. on Good Friday and reflects the Madonna's mourning as she finds her son dead. Hundreds of participants, dressed this time in hooded black gowns, march down Corso Italia and then wind through the smaller lanes of Sorrento. This second procession is much larger and better attended.

Geography

Climate 
Sorrento experiences a Mediterranean climate (Köppen climate classification Csa). with mild, wet winters and warm, dry summers. The mild climate and fertility of the Gulf of Naples made the region famous during Roman times, when emperors such as Claudius and Tiberius holidayed nearby.

Culture

Sorrento has been visited by Lord Byron, John Keats, Johann Wolfgang von Goethe, Charles Dickens, Richard Wagner, Henrik Ibsen, and Friedrich Nietzsche. Sorrento was the birthplace of the poet Torquato Tasso, author of the Gerusalemme Liberata. The town was featured in the early 20th century song "Torna a Surriento" (Come Back to Sorrento) with lyrics by Giambattista De Curtis, brother of the song's composer, Ernesto De Curtis. In the 1920s, famous Soviet writer Maxim Gorky lived in Sorrento.

Songs that have featured Surrento prominently have included "Torna a Surriento" and "Caruso", a song composed in Sorrento, in the summer of 1985, by the Bolognese singer-songwriter Lucio Dalla, whose fifty-years ties with Sorrento are described in the novel by the Sorrentine writer, Raffaele Lauro, titled "Caruso The Song - Lucio Dalla and Sorrento", which was released in December 2014.

The local football team is Football Club Sorrento that plays at the Stadio Italia, and currently plays in the Eccellenza Campania of the Italian Football League.

Main sights 

 Amalfi Coast
 Marina Grande, port of Sorrento
 Marina Piccola, small port of Sorrento
 Park of Villa communale with a view of the Gulf of Naples with the volcano Vesuvius
 Piazza Tasso, central place in Sorrento
 Sorrento funicular (1883-1886), remnants of the defunct inclined railway descending from Hotel Vittoria
 Museo della tarsia lignea (intarsia)
 Museum Correale (Museo Correale di Terranova), museum with small archeologic department
 Via San Cesareo, Sorrento's main shopping street
 Cathedral of Sorrento (Santi Filippo e Giacomo Cathedral), from the 14th century with façade reconstructed in 1924. It was built over time in different styles, with doors of the 11th century from Constantinople.
 Church of 
 Monastery of St Francesco, 14th century
 Roman ruins at the Punta del Capo
 Vallone dei Mulini (Valley of the Mills), see Vallone dei Mulini at Wikipedia Italiano

Transportation
Sorrento is served by ferry or hydrofoil from Naples or Capri as well as by boat services from the ports of the Bay of Naples and the Sorrentine Peninsula. Naples is served by two ports, Mergellina and Molo Beverello. Sorrento is connected to Naples by the Circumvesuviana rail line. Friends of Sorrento has details of buses serving Sorrento.

Airports
 The nearest airports are:
 Napoli-Capodichino (NAP) 53 km
 Salerno-Pontecagnano (QSR) 75 km

Notable people 

 Antoninus of Sorrento (555 or 556 - 625) an Italian abbot, hermit, and saint
 Saint Baculus of Sorrento (7th C) venerated as a Bishop of Sorrento
 Nardo Mormile (died 1493) a Roman Catholic prelate, Archbishop of Sorrento 1480–1493
 Antonius Agellius (1532 in Sorrento – 1608) Bishop of Acerno and a member of the Theatines
 Torquato Tasso (1544–1595), Italian poet  of the 16th century
 Giuseppe Agellio (1570 in Sorrento – after 1620) an Italian painter of the Baroque period
 Giacomo di Castro (c.1597 in Sorrento - 1687) an Italian painter of the Baroque period
 Sylvester Shchedrin (1791 – 1830 in Sorrento) a Russian landscape painter, emigrated to Italy in 1818 
 Edoardo De Martino CVO (1838 Meta di Sorrento – 1912) an Italian-British painter, mainly active in London, painted warships and marine battles
 Bonaventura Gargiulo (1843–1904), Italian Capuchin monk, editor and publisher and Bishop of the Roman Catholic Diocese of San Severo
 Friedrich Nietzsche (1844-1900) the German philosopher was in Sorrento for 6 months, in 1876. He there wrote Human, All Too Human.
 Maxim Gorky (1868–1936) a Russian and Soviet writer, a founder of the socialist realism literary method and a political activist, five-time nominee for the Nobel Prize in Literature. Lived in Sorrento during his second exile from 1921 to 1928 
 Aniello Califano (1870 in Sorrento – 1919) an Italian poet and writer, author of Neapolitan songs
 Enrico Garff (born 1939) an Italian portrait painter and colourist, he has worked Positano, Sorrento, Rome, Sicily and in Sweden and Finland
 Raffaele Lauro (born 1944 in Sorrento), politician and writer

Twin towns – sister cities

Sorrento is twinned with:

 Dubrovnik, Croatia
 Eilat, Israel
 Kumano, Japan
 Mar del Plata, Argentina
 Nice, France
 San Martino Valle Caudina, Italy
 Santa Fe, United States
 Skien, Norway
 Taurasi, Italy
 Sorrento, Australia

See also
Amalfi Coast
Sorrentine Peninsula
Torna a Surriento

References

Other sources
 

 
Cities and towns in Campania
Coastal towns in Campania
Roman sites of Campania